The following is a list of Sites of Special Scientific Interest in the South Lochaber  Area of Search; for North Lochaber see List of SSSIs in North Lochaber. For SSSIs elsewhere in Scotland, see List of SSSIs by Area of Search.

 Ard Trilleachan
 Ardgour Pinewoods
 Ardnamurchan
 Ardsheal Peninsula
 Beinn Iadain and Beinn na H-Uamha
 Callert  De-notified (confirmed) on 22 March 2012
 Carnach Wood
 Claish Moss
 Doire Donn
 Drimnin to Killundine Woods
 Eas na Broige
 Garbh Shlios
 Glencoe
 Inninmore Bay
 Kentallen
 Kentra Bay and Moss
 Kingshouse
 Leven Valley
 Loch Aline
 Loch Moidart
 Loch Shiel
 Onich Dry Gorge
 Onich Shore
 Rannoch Moor
 River Moidart
 Rudha Cuil - Cheanna
 St John's Church
 Strontian Mines
 Strontian River
 Sunart

 
South Lochaber